The little shrikethrush has been split into the following species:

 Arafura shrikethrush, 	Colluricincla megarhyncha 
 Variable shrikethrush, 	Colluricincla fortis
 Waigeo shrikethrush, 	Colluricincla affinis
 Mamberamo shrikethrush, 	Colluricincla obscura
 Tagula shrikethrush, 	Colluricincla discolor
 Sepik-Ramu shrikethrush, 	Colluricincla tappenbecki
 Rufous shrikethrush, 	Colluricincla rufogaster

Birds by common name
Toxic birds